Ram Teri Ganga Maili is a 1985 Indian Hindi-language romantic drama film directed by Raj Kapoor. The film stars Mandakini and Rajiv Kapoor in lead roles. Music director Ravindra Jain received a Filmfare Award for this film.

The film generated controversy because of Mandakini's bold scenes of breastfeeding and bathing in a transparent saree, which wasn't something the conservative Indian Film Certification Board allowed then. Yet, it had a U (Universal) age rating, which was later amended to U/A. It was the last film directed by Raj Kapoor.

Ram Teri Ganga Maili is included in the 'All-Time Blockbusters' list of Indian Cinema. It was certified Diamond Jubilee in Mumbai and Golden Jubilee in other major cities. The film was the year's highest-grossing film. It was also one of the highest-grossing films of the 1980s, alongside Kranti (1981) and Maine Pyar Kiya (1989).

Plot
Narendra Sahay a.k.a. "Naren" is the son of Jeeva Sahay. He is a rich politician in Calcutta (now Kolkata). Naren visits Gangotri to study the source of the holy river Ganga, and to get some holy water for his wheelchair-using paternal grandmother. There he meets a very pretty girl named Ganga Singh (played by Mandakini). Ganga lives near Gangotri with her brother, Karam. Very soon, they fell in love with each other and decided to get married. They are happily married but all of a sudden Naren has to go back to Calcutta as he wanted to convince his parents about Ganga. While leaving for Calcutta, he promised that very soon he will come back to her. But in actual he could not do so because of some unavoidable circumstances.

Ganga became pregnant at the time of his leaving and soon, she becomes mother of a child. She faces many problems at her place because of her child and her beauty. Ganga was alone and no one was there to look after her; finally she decides to go to her husband, Naren. Ganga travels from her place, Gangotri to Calcutta to find her husband. At Rishikesh, she was exploited by two women and a man. Then at Benaras, she was molested by a Pandit, rescued by the police and given a ticket to Calcutta. She fell into the clutches of Manilal who lured her to a brothel near Benaras. At the end she meets her husband when he was getting married to another girl. His father fixes his marriage with Radha Choudhary (played by Divya Rana), who is the daughter of his friend, Bhagwat Choudhary (played by Raza Murad). Naren was being informed that Ganga is dead. So, he decided to marry according to his father's wish. On the other hand, Ganga is invited to dance on her husband's marriage. But lastly, love wins and Naren recognizes his wife Ganga. They try to go away from there with their son but Bhagwat Choudhary shoots Ganga in a fit of rage. Ganga gets shot by him on her hand and Naren starts beating Bhagwat Choudhary, believing that he killed Ganga. But then Radha informs him that Ganga isn't dead yet. Naren stops beating Bhagwat and leaves with Ganga and their son.

Cast
 Rajiv Kapoor as Narendra "Naren" Sahay
 Mandakini as Ganga Sahay
 Divya Rana as Radha B. Choudhary
 Sushma Seth as Dadima
 Saeed Jaffrey as Kunj Bihari
 Kulbhushan Kharbanda as Jeeva Sahay
 Raza Murad as Bhagwat Choudhary
 Geeta Siddharth as Mrs. Sahay
 Trilok Kapoor as Professor
 Krishan Dhawan as Manilal
 Vishwa Mehra as Postbabu
 Urmila Bhatt as Tajeshwaribai
 A.K. Hangal as Brij Kishore
 Gautam Sarin as Naren's fellow student
 Monty Nath as Naren's fellow student who lost his watch
 Kamaldeep as Chamanlal
 Tom Alter as Karam Singh (Ganga's elder brother)
 Javed Khan Amrohi as Manglu (Ganga's fiance)

Production 
According to Padmini Kolhapure, she was the initial choice for the female lead role but declined because the script had a kissing scene. Mandakini, who ultimately played the role, disputed Kolhapure's claims. She said Raj Kapoor wanted only a new face, rather than an established actress, as he believed he could not "make someone pure Ganga if they have an established image". Mandakini also stated that she did not breastfeed despite popular belief, but the scene was shot in a way to suggest that.

Cultural allusions
According to Philip Lutgendorf, the movie is an allegory that "synthesizes classical and mythic narrative, soft-core political and social commentary (here condemning the corruption of politicians and capitalists and championing the nascent environmental initiatives of Prime Minister Rajiv Gandhi). The narrative recapitulates the Abhijñānaśākuntalam story that first appeared in the epic Mahabharata and then was reworked, some six hundred years later, by the poet Kalidasa."

The final song sequence "Ek Radha ek Meera" brings Raj Kapoor's personal experiences with filmdom and reality. This song sequence is the climax of the plot where the bride-to-be is face-to-face with the other "saut", the culturally "polluted" dancer who has made that journey from the pure source of the Himalayas to the ever-flowing and ever-absorbing Ganges with all of the human impurities. It also differentiates between the love of Radha and Meera and reconnects the movie back to the Krishna Leelas.

The movie was a hit, and it earned Mandakini a Filmfare nomination as Best Actress. The film also caused a stir because of two scenes: one in which Mandakini bathes under a waterfall wearing only a flimsy white saree through which her breasts are clearly visible and another in which she is shown breast-feeding a child. Some critics claimed that the scenes were vulgar and exploitative, and were used to get around the Censor Board's stringent rules against nudity. Kapoor defended the inclusion of the scenes stating that they were tasteful.

Awards

 33rd Filmfare Awards:

Won

 Best Film – Randhir Kapoor
 Best Director – Raj Kapoor
 Best Music Director – Ravindra Jain
 Best Art Direction – Suresh J. Sawant
 Best Editing – Raj Kapoor

Nominated

 Best Actress – Mandakini
 Best Supporting Actor – Saeed Jaffrey
 Best Lyricist – Hasrat Jaipuri for "Sun Sahiba Sun"
 Best Male Playback Singer – Suresh Wadkar for "Main Hi Main Hoon"
Best Story – Raj Kapoor

Songs
Music of this movie was given by late Ravindra Jain, who won Fimfare Award for Best Music Director for this.
 "Ek Dukhiyari Kahe" – Lata Mangeshkar & chorus Lyrics-Ravindra Jain
 "Ek Radha Ek Meera" – Lata Mangeshkar Lyrics-Ravindra Jain
 "Husn Pahadon Ka" – Lata Mangeshkar, Suresh Wadkar Lyrics-Ravindra Jain
 "Ram Teri Ganga Maili Ho Gayee" – Part 1 – Suresh Wadkar Lyrics-Ravindra Jain
 "Sun Sahiba Sun Pyaar Ki Dhun Maine Tujhe Chun Liya" – Lata Mangeshkar & chorus; Lyrics – Hasrat Jaipuri
 "Tujhe Bulayen Yeh Meri Bahen" – Lata Mangeshkar Lyrics-Ravindra Jain
 "Yaara O Yaara" – Lata Mangeshkar, Suresh Wadkar Lyrics-Ravindra Jain
 "Ram Teri Ganga Maili Ho Gayee" – Part 2 – Suresh Wadkar & Chorus Lyrics-Ravindra Jain
 "Main Hi Main Hoon -Suresh Wadkar; Lyrics – Amir Qazalbash

References

External links
 

1985 films
1980s Hindi-language films
Films directed by Raj Kapoor
Films set in Kolkata
R. K. Films films
Indian erotic drama films
1980s erotic drama films
Films scored by Ravindra Jain
1985 drama films